Redvales is a residential district to the south of Bury town centre in Greater Manchester in the United Kingdom. The population of the Bury Ward at the 2011 census was 11,483. Roughly-speaking, the area occupies the area from Manchester Road to the River Irwell, crossed by Radcliffe Road, Redvales Road and Tarn Drive.

Toponymy
The origin of the name 'Redvales' goes back to the 13th century: it was 'Redgifuhalh' meaning a lady living near a river.

History
From 1890-1918, Redvales was home to Bury Golf Club, where Harry Vardon was professional and greenskeeper, until 1918 when the land was commandeered to support agricultural food production, after which the club moved to nearby Unsworth.

Landmarks
St Peter's Primary School, with Derby High School on its fringes. There are shops on Radcliffe Road and Redvales Road. The Warth Mill was once a major employer for the area, but has since declined. The Warth Mill is situated on the Irwell. Donald MacPherson Paint Company were located here until the 1990s. They supplied paint for the Woolworths chain.

Radcliffe Road was built and opened as recently as 1927.  There was a ceremony on Warth Bridge with representatives of both Bury, the mayor Councillor John Hill JP, and Radcliffe taking part.

Housing

Most of Redvales is built up with semi-detached housing, with other main thoroughfares being Cardigan Drive, Brecon Drive, Warth Road, Ribchester Drive and Whitefield Road.
There are some traditional mill cottages near to the Irwell. The poorhouse was also situated at Redvales.

References

Geography of the Metropolitan Borough of Bury
Areas of Greater Manchester
Bury, Greater Manchester